Culturenet Cymru Ltd. is funded by the Welsh Assembly Government and is based at The National Library of Wales in Aberystwyth. Its brief is to work in conjunction with both its members and community groups to develop a range of exciting and innovative projects. Its aim is to use online resources to increase awareness of, and improve access for all to, the culture and history of Wales.
Culturenet Cymru projects include:
 100 Welsh Heroes - a poll to find the most popular Welsh people from history. It led to a book of the same name.
 Gathering the Jewels
 Community Archives Wales
 Their Past Your Future Wales
 Glaniad

References

Further information
Culturenet Cymru Website

Non-profit organisations based in Wales
Organisations based in Aberystwyth
Cultural organisations based in Wales